The Grammy Awards have been held at multiple locations throughout the years. In 1971 the Grammy Awards had its first live telecast and therefore had its own sole venue each year for the telecast. From 1963 to 1970 the Academy aired a TV special annually called "The Best On Record" which highlighted the awards dinners. Since 2000, the Grammy Awards have been held most years at Crypto.com Arena located in Downtown Los Angeles.

Non-televised era
From 1959 to 1970, awards dinners were held in the following locations simultaneously on the same day:

1959–1961: Los Angeles, Beverly Hills and New York
1962–1964: Chicago, Los Angeles and New York
1965–1970: Chicago, Los Angeles, Nashville and New York

Televised era
Grammy Award ceremonies have been televised live since 1971. The Crypto.com Arena (known as Staples Center from 1999 until 2021) has hosted the most Grammy Award telecasts, having hosted nineteen times. The Shrine Auditorium which hosted sixteen times was surpassed by the Staples Center in 2017. Los Angeles has held a total of 38 Grammy Award telecasts, with New York having hosted ten times and Nashville serving as host once.

Ceremonies

Multiple ceremonies locations

Most frequent venues
With twenty telecasts hosted, Crypto.com Arena has hosted the most Grammy telecasts. The Shrine Auditorium hosted fifteen times between 1978 and 1999. 

While Crypto.com Arena hosts the main telecast which is broadcast on CBS, the premiere ceremony (also known as the Pre-Telecast) is held at the neighboring Microsoft Theater, which is just across the street from the Crypto.com Arena. The MusiCares Person of the Year tribute is held at the adjacent Los Angeles Convention Center two days prior to the Grammy Awards.

Most frequent host cities

Los Angeles has held a total of 40 Grammy telecasts, and a total of 51 including the pre-broadcast era years.

Multiple ceremonies hosted 

The following individuals have hosted (or co-hosted) the Grammy Awards ceremony on two or more occasions.

See also
List of Latin Grammy Award ceremony locations

References

External links
Awards at the Internet Movie Database

.Ceremony locations
Grammy Award
Grammy Award venues